Ouaguenoun is a district east of Tizi Ouzou, Kabylie region, Algeria.  Its central town is Tikobain.

Villages in Ouaguenoun include Ighil Bouchene.

Communes of Tizi Ouzou Province
Cities in Algeria